Wonderland Ankara is an amusement park in Ankara, Turkey.

It was opened on 5 October 2004. There are artificial turf pitches, basketball and tennis courts, miniature golf courses, go-kart and skateboard tracks and the Nejat Uygur amphitheater with a seating capacity of 5,000 people, built by the Ankara Metropolitan Municipality Environmental Protection and Control Department.

External links 

Parks in Ankara
Urban public parks
2004 establishments in Turkey
Amusement parks in Turkey
Amusement parks opened in 2004